Ryan Kevin Beatty (born September 25, 1995) is an American singer-songwriter. He was born in Clovis, California, and now resides in Los Angeles.

His debut EP, Because of You, was released in 2012. After a hiatus, Beatty began to majorly re-emerge in 2017, first with collaborations on Brockhampton's albums Saturation II and Saturation III. Then, in 2018 he signed to Benny Blanco's imprint label at Interscope Records, Mad Love Records, and released his debut album, Boy in Jeans, on July 20, 2018. He continued his work with Brockhampton on their 2019 album Ginger and member Kevin Abstract's third solo album, Arizona Baby. Beatty has also collaborated with Tyler, the Creator on his Grammy Award-winning album Igor and the EP Music Inspired by Illumination & Dr. Seuss' The Grinch. He would go on to release his second album, Dreaming of David, on January 31, 2020.

Career

Early career (2011–2016) 
Starting in 2011, Beatty covered popular songs and posted them on his YouTube channel. The videos were highly viewed with his most popular song, a cover of Bruno Mars' "Marry You", gaining over 6 million views. He released his debut single "Every Little Thing" in November 2011, which reached #89 on the iTunes Pop Charts. Ryan Seacrest premiered Beatty's debut music video "Every Little Thing" on February 2, 2012.

Beatty released his debut EP Because of You which premiered on Radio Disney on July 23, 2012 and was released to the public exclusively on iTunes on July 24, 2012. Within 24 hours of its release, Because of You landed in the #1 spot on the US Pop Album Charts and #7 spot on the Top Album Charts. In 2012, Beatty was chosen to be one of the faces of AT&T's national "It Can Wait" campaign to end texting and driving. The PSA, which urged fans to take the pledge not to text and drive, aired nationwide. Ryan spent the summer of 2013 touring as one of the opening acts on Cody Simpson's Paradise Tour. His first headlining tour was scheduled for November 2013, but was postponed until 2014.

In subsequent interviews after the release of his debut album, Boy in Jeans, in 2018, Beatty described this period somewhat negatively. He felt both creatively and emotionally constrained by his image as a "straight" teen heartthrob and the lack of input he was allowed when he was recording music.

In 2013, he opted to fire his initial management team only a little over a year after his quick rise to recognition had begun. In a 2020 interview with The Guardian, Beatty recalled firing his manager on a plane flying back to Los Angeles after a gig and telling them, "I can't do this anymore." His decision to fire his management and separate from his first label led to a protracted legal battle that prevented him from releasing music until 2016.

Recent career (2016–present) 
After being inactive for three years, Beatty began to return to recording music in 2016 with the release of his singles "Passion" and "Stay Gold". That same year, he also publicly came out as gay. In 2017, he began collaborating with the rap collective Brockhampton, providing backing vocals on Saturation II's "Queer" and Saturation III's "Bleach".

In 2018, Beatty released his first studio album Boy In Jeans featuring singles "Bruise" and "Camo". He released music videos for almost every song on the album, with the exceptions of "Cupid", "Money", and "Speed". The first music video from the album for "Bruise" was directed by Brockhampton's Kevin Abstract. That same year, he also collaborated with rapper Tyler, the Creator on his EP Music Inspired by Illumination & Dr. Seuss' The Grinch and producer Benny Blanco on his album Friends Keep Secrets. Additionally, he performed with Brockhampton on The Tonight Show Starring Jimmy Fallon, alongside Jazmine Sullivan and serpentwithfeet, singing backing vocals on an early version of the song "Tonya" which later appeared on their album Iridescence. His backing vocals were later cut from the final version of the song.

Starting in January 2019, Beatty embarked on a short tour in support of his album Boy in Jeans, first with shows in Los Angeles and Brooklyn and then continuing in March with a West Coast tour with shows in Seattle, Portland, San Francisco, San Diego, and Los Angeles. In a 2020 interview with Complex magazine, he said that he initially delayed touring after the release of Boy in Jeans in order to focus on recording his second album, Dreaming of David. He continued his collaborations into 2019 with features on Brockhampton member, Kevin Abstract's, third solo album Arizona Baby, Tyler, the Creator's Grammy Award-winning album Igor, Brockhampton's album Ginger (including the single "Sugar"), and Slow Hollow's album Actors.

Soon after the completion of his album Boy in Jeans in 2018, Beatty began work on his follow up album Dreaming of David through 2019. From the end of 2019 into early 2020, Beatty began releasing the singles "Dark Circles", "Patchwork", and "Casino", each with their own accompanying music videos, in the lead up to the release of his second album. On January 31, 2020, Ryan Beatty released Dreaming of David. Soon afterwards, he announced a US tour called "David, I Love You" in support of the album, though this was later cancelled due to the social distancing measures taken in response to the COVID-19 pandemic. Additionally, he appeared in Brockhampton's second music video for their single "Sugar" released in February 2020. He was also featured alongside Dua Lipa and Jon B in the remix of "Sugar", released in March 2020, which included an additional solo verse for Beatty not in the original version. In May 2020, Brockhampton released a single, titled "Twisted", exclusively on YouTube which featured Beatty and Christian Alexander.

Personal life 
Beatty came out as gay in June 2016, at the age of 20, three weeks after the Orlando nightclub shooting. He uploaded an Instagram photo of a Gay Power balloon on his Instagram account with the following caption: "proud to be a raging homosexual. it's taken 20 years of suffocating in the closet for me to become comfortable enough to say it, but now I can finally breathe. i did it!"

In May 2020, Beatty expressed support for the Black Lives Matter movement in the wake of national outrage in response to the murder of George Floyd by Minnesota police officer Derek Chauvin. He shared multiple tweets in support of the movement and compelling others to act, in addition to posts from him at a protest on his Instagram story.

Awards, features and nominations 

 2011: Billboard magazine – Named Beatty as #10 on the Next Big Sound chart featuring the fastest growing artists across social media
 2011: PopStar! magazine – named him one of the 12 new artists to look out for in 2012
 2011: J-14 magazine – Beatty was featured as their "Hot Guy of the Week"
2012: Teen Choice Awards – Choice Web Star – Nominated
 2012: Named to Billboard's "21 Under 21"
 2013: Teen Choice Awards – Choice Web Star – Nominated

Discography

Albums

EPs

Singles

As main artist

Guest appearances

References

1995 births
Living people
21st-century American male singers
21st-century American singers
American male pop singers
American male singer-songwriters
Gay singers
LGBT people from California
American LGBT singers
American LGBT songwriters
Gay songwriters
American gay musicians
People from Clovis, California
Singer-songwriters from California
20th-century American LGBT people
21st-century American LGBT people
American gay writers